"A Shoulder to Cry On" is a song written by Merle Haggard, and recorded by American country music artist Charley Pride.  It was released in January 1973 as the first single from the album Sweet Country.  The song was Pride's eleventh number one on the country charts.  The single stayed at number one for a single week and spent thirteen weeks on the country chart.

Chart performance

References

1973 singles
Charley Pride songs
Songs written by Merle Haggard
Song recordings produced by Jack Clement
RCA Records singles
1973 songs